Nai Mueang is the name of 22 subdistricts (Tambon) in Thailand.

Nai Mueang, Lamphun
Nai Mueang, Uttaradit
Nai Mueang, Buriram